Bazin (pronounced , is an unleavened bread in the cuisine of Libya prepared with barley, water and salt. Bazin is prepared by boiling barley flour in water and then beating it to create a dough using a magraf, which is a unique stick designed for this purpose. The dough may then be placed in a pan and allowed time to harden, after which it is baked or steamed. The salt contributes to the hardness of the bazin. Bazin may have a paste-like and hardened texture. It may also be prepared using whole wheat flour, olive oil and pepper as ingredients.

Bazin is typically served with a tomato sauce, eggs, potatoes and mutton. This preparation method involves shaping the dough into the shape of a pyramid or dome, after which it may be served with a tomato-based soup or meat-and-potato stew poured atop or around it and garnished with hard-boiled eggs. A raw egg may also be placed in the hot soup. Aseeda is a dish prepared using bazin, honey, date syrup and butter or oil. Bazin may also be accompanied with a cooked pumpkin and tomato sauce mixture.

When consumed, bazin may be "crumpled and eaten with the fingers." It is typically eaten using the right hand, and may be consumed communally. Bazin has been described as a traditional dish and as a national dish of Libya.

Sauce
Bazin sauce may be prepared by frying mutton (preferably shoulder or leg) with chopped onions, turmeric, salt, chilli powder, helba (fenugreek), sweet paprika, black pepper and tomato paste. Broad beans, lentils and potatoes may also be added. The sauce, eggs, potatoes and meat are arranged around the dough dome. The dish is typically served with lemon and fresh or pickled (imsaiyar) chillies.

History
The old way of making bazin is to form the dough into palm-size cakes and cook in water in a special copper pot called a qidir. The barley cakes, having become solid, are then broken up in the pot with a large, flat, wooden ladle and mixed to form one large piece. Nowadays, a blender is often used, or the dough is cooked immediately in water like a pudding.

See also
 List of Middle Eastern dishes

 Fufu
 List of African dishes
 List of breads

Notes

References

External links

 "37. Bazeen (from Dr. B. Shetewi)", a recipe from Libyan Cuisine and Recipes
 "Bazeen (By: mahmud abudaber)", a recipe from Janzour.com
 Of “Bazeen” and Local Cuisine, Zainab Al-Arabi"

Arab cuisine
Libyan cuisine
National dishes
Unleavened breads
Barley-based dishes
Middle Eastern cuisine